Dolene is a village in Petrich Municipality, in Blagoevgrad Province, Bulgaria.

References

 41.44566030413195, 23.03098136874828

Villages in Blagoevgrad Province